MKD may refer to:

 Macedonian denar, ISO 4217 currency code
 Macedonian language, ISO 639-2 code
 North Macedonia, ISO 3166-1 alpha-3 code and IOC country code
 Mevalonate kinase deficiency, a metabolic disorder
 mkd (software), a documentation extractor